Statistics of National Association Foot Ball League in season 1907–08.

League standings

References
NATIONAL ASSOCIATION FOOT BALL LEAGUE (RSSSF)

1907-08
1907–08 domestic association football leagues
1907–08 in American soccer